Baek Min-hyun (born January 13, 1985) is a South Korean actor. He made his acting debut in the television series My Beloved Sister (2006–2007).

Filmography

Films

Television series

References

External links
 
 
 

1985 births
Living people
Male actors from Seoul
Dongguk University alumni
South Korean male film actors
South Korean male television actors
21st-century South Korean male actors